The Yavne Synagogue is a synagogue in Montevideo, Uruguay. 

It is part of Instituto Yavne, a Jewish school.

See also
 List of synagogues in Uruguay

References

Synagogues in Montevideo
Pocitos, Montevideo
Schools in Uruguay